The 1905 Auckland City mayoral election was part of the New Zealand local elections held that same year. In 1905, elections were held for the Mayor of Auckland. The polling was conducted using the standard first-past-the-post electoral method.

Background
Incumbent mayor Edwin Mitchelson decided to retire and not seek re-election. Arthur Myers was elected as Auckland's new mayor.

Mayoralty results

Councillor results

References

Mayoral elections in Auckland
1905 elections in New Zealand
Politics of the Auckland Region
1900s in Auckland